Senator Adkins may refer to:

Betty Adkins (1934–2001), Minnesota State Senate
Joseph Adkins (died 1869), Georgia State Senate